Gready McKinnis (August 11, 1913 - March 4, 1991) was an American Negro league and Minor League baseball pitcher who played for the Birmingham Black Barons, Chicago American Giants, the integrated Tampa Smokers and St. Petersburg Saints.

References

External links
 and Seamheads

1913 births
1991 deaths
People from Greene County, Alabama
Baseball players from Alabama
Birmingham Black Barons players
Chicago American Giants players
St. Petersburg Saints players
Tampa Smokers players
20th-century African-American sportspeople